Jesse Ramien (born 27 April 1997) is an Australian professional rugby league footballer who plays as a  for the Cronulla-Sutherland Sharks in the NRL.

He has previously played for the Newcastle Knights as well as a previous spell at the Cronulla club in the National Rugby League. Ramien has also played at representative level for the Indigenous All Stars.

Background
Ramien was born in Dubbo, New South Wales, Australia, and is of Indigenous Australian descent.

He played his junior rugby league for the Coonamble Bears, before being signed by the Manly Warringah Sea Eagles.

Playing career

Early career
From 2014 to 2016, Ramien played for the Manly Warringah Sea Eagles' NYC team. Mid-season in 2016, he made the switch to the Cronulla-Sutherland Sharks' NYC team.

2017
In February, Ramien played for the Sharks' first-grade side in the 2017 World Club Challenge match against the Wigan Warriors, a game in which he scored a try. In May, he played for the Junior Kangaroos against the Junior Kiwis. In round 26 of the 2017 NRL season, he made his NRL debut for the Sharks against the Newcastle Knights, scoring a try. The very next day, he was named at centre in the Team of the Year.

2018
In February, Ramien signed a 2-year contract with the Newcastle Knights starting in 2019. In round 12 against the Knights, he scored two tries in the Sharks' 48-10 win at Hunter Stadium.

2019
Ramien made his Knights debut in round 1 of the season in Newcastle's 14-8 victory over his former side the Sharks. Throughout the season, there was speculation that he was unhappy playing for the Knights due to a lack of ball passed his way at right centre, the Knights favouring their left edge more. After playing in 17 games and scoring 2 tries, Ramien was left out of the team for their round 20 game following four straight losses for the Knights. It was reported that during the week coach Nathan Brown approached him at training and told him if he was unhappy at the club and wanted to seek an immediate release then Newcastle head of football Brian Canavan could make that happen. The day after, Ramien was granted permission negotiate with other clubs and leave the Knights immediately, however due to it being past the NRL's June 30 mid-season transfer deadline, he would not be allowed to play for another club until the 2020 season.

2020
In round 4 of the 2020 NRL season, Ramien scored two tries as Cronulla-Sutherland won their first game of the year defeating North Queensland 26-16 at Queensland Country Bank Stadium.

2021
Ramien made 17 appearances for Cronulla in the 2021 NRL season which saw the club narrowly miss the finals by finishing 9th on the table.

2022
In round 9 of the 2022 NRL season, Ramien was sent to the sin bin for an illegal shoulder charge during the clubs victory over the New Zealand Warriors. Cronulla won the game despite being down to 11 men.
In round 17, Ramien scored a hat-trick in Cronulla's 28-6 victory over Melbourne.
Ramien played a total of 23 games for Cronulla in 2022 scoring ten tries.  Ramien played in both of Cronulla's finals matches which saw the club eliminated in straight sets.

Statistics

NRL
 Statistics are correct as of the end of the 2022 season

All Star

References

External links

Cronulla Sharks profile
NRL.com profile

1997 births
Living people
Australian rugby league players
Indigenous Australian rugby league players
Cronulla-Sutherland Sharks players
Newcastle Knights players
Junior Kangaroos players
Rugby league centres
Rugby league players from Dubbo